The Grand Prix de Marseille was a Formula One motor race held on 22 May 1949 at the Parc Borély in Marseille. The race was held over two heats of 15 laps, from which the top six drivers would qualify for the final; a repechage for those who failed to qualify, from which the first two would qualify for the final; and the final itself of 50 laps. The winner was Juan Manuel Fangio in a Simca Gordini Type 15. Philippe Étancelin was second in a Talbot-Lago T26C and Maurice Trintignant third in a Simca Gordini Type 15.

Classification

Heats

Miscellaneous
The following drivers are mentioned in the entry list but either did not qualify for the heats, or did not attend.

2Car driven by Loyer

Repechage

Final

References

Marseille
Marseille
Marseille